is an anime adaptation of the 1906 novel The Wonderful Adventures of Nils by the Swedish author Selma Lagerlöf. The 52 episode series ran on the Japanese network NHK from January 1980 to March 1981. The series was the first production by Pierrot. The anime was mostly true to the original, apart from the appearance of Nils's pet hamster, and the larger role given to Smirre the fox. The music was written by Czech composer Karel Svoboda; Yukihide Takekawa provided the soundtrack for its original Japanese broadcast and for some other countries.

The anime was also broadcast in Canada (in French), France, Germany, Sweden, Finland ("Peukaloisen retket" – "Thumbling's Travels"), Iceland (as "Nilli Hólmgeirsson"), the Netherlands, Belgium, Greece (as "Το θαυμαστό ταξίδι του Νίλς Χόλγκερσον" – "The wondrous journey of Nils Holgersson"), Bulgaria ("Чудното пътуване на Нилс Холгерсон с дивите гъски" – "The wondrous journey of Nils Holgersson with the Wild Geese"), Poland (as "Nils and the wild geese"), Portugal, Romania (as "Aventurile lui Nils Holgersson"), in the Arab world (as "مغامرات نيلز" – "Nils's Adventures"), Spain, Slovenia (as "Nils Holgerson" with only one "s"), Slovakia (again as "Nils Holgerson"), Hungary (as "Nils Holgersson csodálatos utazása a vadludakkal"), Israel (as "נילס הולגרסון" – "Nils Holgersson"), Turkey (as "Nils ve Uçan Kaz" – "Nils and the Flying Goose"), Italy, Hong Kong (dubbed into Cantonese), Mainland China, South Africa (in Afrikaans as "Die wonderlike avonture van Nils Holgerson"), and Albania (as "Aventurat e Nils Holgersonit"). In some countries it was edited for length to allow for commercials. In Germany, the episodes of the animated series were also combined into a full-length animated feature (1h 22min) released in 1981; that feature was also dubbed and released in Estonia on DVD and VHS. The anime was also adapted into a German comic book series, with art by the Spanish Studio Interpubli and the German Atelier Roche.

Plot
Nils Holgersson is a 14-year-old farm boy, the son of poor farmers. He is lazy and disrespectful to others. In his spare time he enjoys tormenting the animals that live on his family farm.

One Sunday, while his parents are at church and have left him home to read the day's homily in the family Bible, Nils captures a tomte in a net. In exchange for his freedom, the tomte offers Nils a large gold coin. Nils rejects the offer, and so the tomte transforms Nils into a tomte himself, shrinking him and his pet hamster Carrot to a tiny size and granting him the ability to talk with animals. The farm animals are delighted to see their tormentor reduced to their size and become angry and hungry for revenge. Meanwhile, wild geese are flying over the farm during their spring migration, and they taunt a white farm goose named Morten (whom Nils has also tormented by typing a rope around his neck). Morten decides he wants to join the wild flock. Escaping from the angry animals, Nils scrambles onto Morten's back with his new friend Carrot, and they join the flock of wild geese flying towards Lapland for the summer.

The wild geese, who are not pleased at all to be joined by a boy and a domestic goose, eventually take him on an adventurous trip across all the historical provinces of Sweden. They encounter many adventures and characters such as Smirre the fox. Nils's adventures, as well as the characters and situations he encounters, teach him to help other people and not to be selfish. In the course of the trip, Nils learns that if he can prove he has changed for the better, the tomte might be disposed to change him back to his normal size.

Main characters

 Nils - Nils is the main protagonist of the series. He lives with his family on a farm in southern Sweden. Nils is lazy and disrespectful to others and enjoys tormenting the animals on the farm. After the farm's tomte magically shrinks Nils smaller than the animals, he gains the ability to speak and understand animals' language. When the farm animals seek revenge, Nils flies away with a flock of wild geese on their migration to the north of Sweden for the summer. Nils fervently wants to be restored to his original size.
 Carrot - Nils's hamster friend (and former pet) who also joins him on the adventure. Carrot becomes one of Nils's closest friends. (Carrot's name sometimes appears as Crumb.)
 Morten - A goose originally belonging to Nils's family. In the first episode Nils flies away from his farm on Morten's back to escape the vengeful farm animals whom Nils tormented before he was shrunk. Nils and Morten have their differences, but at the end one can see how much they care for each other.
 Captain Akka (Akka of Kebnekaise) - The matriarch of the wild geese flock. She is strict but kind-hearted and cares very much for Nils. As the story progresses, Akka's friendship with Nils grows.
 Gusta - A often grumpy but strong goose, and Lasse's friend. But when Lasse marries his crush Suirii, Gusta starts to tease him. He is the only goose who does not marry.
 Ingrid - A beautiful elegant female geese, initially captured by Smirre the fox. She survives and, later, partners with Gunnar.
 Gunnar - At the beginning of the journey, he is quite stern. Over time, and after he falls in love with Ingrid, he learns to loosen up.
 Dunfuin - A warm-hearted, if not very bright female goose of the flock. She marries Morten, who is madly in love with her at first sight. 
 Smirre - A fox and the series' primary antagonist, who wants to catch and eat the wild geese. Thanks to Nils, He never succeeds. Smirre follows the wild geese all the way to Lapland.
 Rosenbaum - A wooden statue that comes to life. He is loyal to his majesty King Charles, but helps Nils when he can.
 Ondori -
 Gacho -
 Gorgo - A large, black eagle, found in an empty nest by Akka years ago. She raised him and taught him how to survive by eating fish, instead of preying on the geese. Nils saves Gorgo from a zoo. Nils, Carrot and Gorgo fly the last stretch together to Lappland. Unfortunately, Gorgo must stay in Lappland when the wild geese leave Lappland to fly south for winter.
 Suirii - A female goose, who sings with a very high pitch voice and annoys everyone. She fell in love with Lasse (from the Afrikaans translation), while Gustav thought that she loved him.
 Ten -
 The Witch of Storm (Isatter Kajsa) - Encountered by Nils and the geese flock in episode 21, where she teaches Nils a lesson by creating extremely harsh weather. She later saved the sister and brother by freezing the river.

Episodes
 Mischievous Nils - 8 January 1980
 Shrunken Nils - 15 January 1980
 Riding a goose - 22 January 1980
 SOS of the forest squirrels - 29 January 1980
 Morten's big pinch - 5 February 1980
 Bird strength contest - 12 February 1980
 Battle of the mice - 26 February 1980
 The crane's ball - 4 March 1980
 Hungry Nils - 11 March 1980
 Lex's evil scheme - 18 March 1980
 Walking lead statue - 25 March 1980
 Morten's first love - 1 April 1980
 Goats of Hell's valley - 8 April 1980
 Phantom town appearing on moonlit nights - 15 April 1980
 The greedy crow and the coin bowl - 22 April 1980
 Choose a crow boss - 29 April 1980
 Ransomed duck child - 6 May 1980
 The lake disappears - 27 May 1980
 Spoiled fawn - 3 June 1980 
 Snake's revenge - 10 June 1980
 A testy witch's prank - 17 June 1980
 Bear twins who prowl the forest - 24 June 1980
 Flood of swan lake - 1 July 1980
 Operation 'To hell with Lex the guard-dog' - 8 July 1980
 Rescue party from the sky - 15 July 1980
 One stormy day - 22 July 1980
 The story until now / Morten's engagement - 5 August 1980
 Nils singing on a streetcorner - 19 August 1980
 Arrested eagle - 26 August 1980
 The taste of freshly baked bread - 9 September 1980
 Monster of the forest - 16 September 1980
 Look out, Nils: A mountain fire - 30 September 1980
 Patrol of five - 7 October 1980
 Battle of the spirits of sun and ice - 14 October 1980
 Goose guard child looking for his father - 21 October 1980
 Bird love - 4 November 1980
 Morten the rookie papa - 11 November 1980
 Lapland, land where the sun never sets - 25 November 1980
 Don't follow me, Golgo - 2 December 1980
 Wolf attack - 9 December 1980 
 Lake fire festival - 16 December 1980
 Big man who built a forest - 23 December 1980
 Nils's lullabye - 13 January 1981
 Bataki shut in - 20 January 1981
 Haunted house on a full moon - 27 January 1981
 Sea shining silver - 3 February 1981
 Main event of the village festival - 10 February 1981
 Lex's new journey - 17 February 1981
 Nils discovers a secret - 24 February 1981
 Wild goose's present - 3 March 1981
 To my old home - 10 March 1981
 Goodbye, Akka - 17 March 1981

Cast
Nils: Mami Koyama
Carrot: Tadashi Yamazaki (character original to anime)
Morten: Yoshito Yasuhara
Akka: Nobuko Terashima
Gunnar: Hideyuki Tanaka
Ingrid: Minori Matsushima
Gusta: Shigeru Chiba
Lasse: Kenichi Ogata
Suirii: Yoneko Matsukane
Dunfin: Kumiko Takizawa
Golgo: Tesshō Genda
Lex: Kei Tomiyama
Fairy: Ryōji Saikachi
Emmerich: Sanji Hase
Nils's Father: Masane Tsukayama
Nils's Mother: Masako Ikeda

Regional releases
A Japanese DVD Region 2 box set of the series was produced in 2002, and a French DVD box set in 2005. The TV movie was released in Bulgaria by A-design. Discotek Media released the TV series with subtitles in 2020. An Afrikaans DVD box set of the series was also produced.

1982 Video Movie
This movie shot in 1982, by the same technical team and director, has the same characteristics as the TV series, but is independent and was shot separately. The production dubbed in Swedish and was not shown theatrically, but released as a VHS video in 1985.

References

External links
 The wonderful Adventures of Nils
  Nils no Fushigi na Tabi
 
  (Japanese title: Gekijô-ban Nirusu no fushigi na tabi)
 
 

1980 anime television series debuts
1981 Japanese television series endings
Japanese children's animated adventure television series
Japanese children's animated fantasy television series
Fantasy anime and manga
NHK original programming
Selma Lagerlöf
Pierrot (company)
Television shows set in Sweden
Anime based on novels
Television shows based on Swedish novels
Television shows adapted into comics
Television shows set on farms
Television series about size change